Morgan Breslin is a former American football linebacker. He played college football at USC.

College career

Diablo Valley College
Breslin attended Diablo Valley College in 2010 and 2011 where he led California JUCO's in sacks and was named JUCO All-American by CCCFA. During his two years he had 28 sacks.

USC
Breslin transferred to the University of Southern California in 2012. During his first year at USC in 2012, he started all 12 games at defensive end recording 62 tackles and 13 sacks. As a senior in 2013 he moved to outside linebacker. Breslin recorded 18 sacks in 18 games during his time at USC.

References

External links
USC Trojans bio

Living people
Sportspeople from Walnut Creek, California
Players of American football from California
American football defensive ends
American football linebackers
Diablo Valley Vikings football players
USC Trojans football players
Year of birth missing (living people)